St Edmund's Church, Walesby is a Grade II* listed parish church in the Church of England in Walesby, Nottinghamshire.

History

The church was built in the 12th century. It was rebuilt in the 16th century by the Stanhope family, and then in the 17th century, 1886 and 1925.

References

Church of England church buildings in Nottinghamshire
Grade II* listed churches in Nottinghamshire